Andrew Blain Baird (1 January 1862 – 9 September 1951) was a Scottish blacksmith and aviation pioneer.

The Man

Andrew Blain Baird was born in 1862 in Sandhead on Luce Bay in the Rhinns of Galloway, Scotland. One of three sons, his father was a fisherman and handloom weaver. He became an apprentice to a blacksmith in Sandhead, worked as a lighthouse keeper on Lismore, then as an ironworker at Smith and McLean's on the Clyde shipyards before finally setting up on his own as a blacksmith at 113 High Street in Rothesay, Isle of Bute in 1887, when he was 25.

In 1892 at the age of 30 Andrew married Euphemia Martin at Glecknabae Farm on Bute.

Baird was a daring thinker, a pioneer and innovator. He created many improvements to the plough, built a unique model of the triple expansion engine powered by electricity and was one of the original members of the Scottish Aeronautical Society.

The Dream
Eager to expand his knowledge of aviation, Baird was said to have corresponded with the early aviators Louis Bleriot and S. F. Cody and exchanged information about construction of aircraft and their flight. Inspired by a visit to Blackpool for England's first ever Aviation Week in October 1909, he returned to Rothesay ready to design and build his own sophisticated monoplane similar to Bleriot's but with an engine built by the Alexander Brothers in Edinburgh that was 4-cylinder, air-cooled and with water-cooled valves. The control system he would design for his aircraft would be unlike anything that had been developed at the time. His wife sewed brown trussore silk for the wings.

Sharing the Dream

The Baird monoplane, once completed in his own shop in the summer of 1910, went on show at an exhibition in the Esplanade Flower Garden at the front of Bute.  and then to the amazement and excitement of all it was moved to the Bute Highland Games on 20 August 1910.

From there it was taken for storage and readying directly to a barn owned by Willie Dickie at his farm at Cranlasgvourity, Bute.

The Historic Day
Scottish aviation history was about to be made when in the very early morning of 11 September 1910, the Baird Monoplane was taken by a Mr Scott on his horse-drawn wagon to Ettrick Bay – with its wide expanse of sand reminiscent of the Kitty Hawk N.C. site chosen by the Wright Brothers for their historic flight.

In the sunshine and amid the wide aspect of Ettrick Bay the first all Scottish heavier than air powered plane sat ready to for an attempt at history.

Andrew Baird was, on that day, assisted by his friend Ned Striven who was an Electrical Engineer with the Burgh of Rothesay and who had assisted him with the engine and related design considerations.

The Baird Monoplane

There alone on the beach sat the aircraft – described as having an exceptionally wide-tracked undercarriage, a canvas pilot's seat, a uniquely designed joystick/wheel for steering, and 71 inch propeller, as seen here being displayed by then 91-year-old Andrew Blain Baird II (son) and Andrew Blain Baird III (grandson) in Rothesay during the Centenary Celebrations in September 2010.

It had a fixed tailwheel and a specially selected Scottish 24 hp Edinburgh built engine. The plane was 25 feet long and weighed 380 pounds. It was constructed of a complex tubular steel forward frame and triangular wire braced rear section made with bamboo longerons and tubular steel spacers. The rectangular wings covered in Mrs Baird's sown silk had a 29-foot span and were placed at a slight angle for stability in flight.

The plane was ready. Andrew Baird was ready.

The Attempt at history

There on the wide expanse of Ettrick Bay beach, Baird and Ned Striven started the engine. All was ready. Hearts raced with anticipation. A small crowd looked on in amazement. And the attempt at his flight into history began.

Flight Magazine on 24 September 1910, described it as follows:

"Mr Baird was seated in the machine and on the engine being started the plane travelled along the sands at good speed.  Naturally, on clearing the ground, the swerving influence of the axle ceased and the influence of the steering wheel brought the machine sharply round to the right causing it to swoop to the ground. The contact was so sharp that the right wheel buckled and the right plane suffered some abrasion by scraping along the beach."

While his monoplane did leave the ground for a few seconds its lack of control and airworthiness does not constitute it as a flight per se; nonetheless Andrew Baird had realised his dream. He had “flown” in an aircraft of his own design and construction. His was the first attempted entirely Scottish flight of a heavier than air powered craft.

After The Flight

Today there is little information regarding what became of the Baird Monoplane body. It is, however known that the Edinburgh-made engine rested in Baird's workshop on the High Street until its demolition in the early 1950s making way for council housing and was given to the Museum of Transport in Glasgow, having first been transported to the Glasgow Museum & Art Galleries. The original propeller, which is in excellent condition, was acquired for the private ownership of a Mr Hunter who was a bank manager in Bute. Upon his retirement, he returned to his home in Lanark where he displayed the propeller on a wall in his house for decades. On his death it was left to his family with the hope it would be presented to the Museum of Flight in East Fortune. The presentation of the propeller was made to The Museum of Flight late in 2010 – one hundred years after it last turned. (and only after it had once again returned to Ettrick Bay on the centenary of Baird's historic event).

Epilogue

Andrew Blain Baird died in Rothesay, Isle of Bute Scotland on 9 September 1951. He had been predeceased by his wife, Euphemia, on 19 January 1938 and by their two daughters, Agnes in 1909 (aged 5) and Susan in 1909 (aged 1 year). They had a son, John Baird, who joined Andrew in his blacksmith business. Another son Andrew Blain Baird II and his son Andrew Blain Baird III and their family  relocated to Arbroath after his death.

On 4 July 1952, the local newspaper, The Buteman, ran both an advertisement for his business and a tribute to the man. The ad simply read: "A. B. Baird & Son, General Blacksmiths and Horse-shoers, Implement Makers and Mechanical Engineers – and Ornamental Iron Workers"

The tribute read:

Baird of Bute Celebrations

Commencing with the centenary of Baird's flight and annually on the first Saturday in September, a Baird of Bute Festival celebration is held on Bute at the newly renamed Andrew Baird Airstrip, and at Ettrick Bay. Many small planes fly in to Baird airstrip then ceremonially over the beach at Ettrick Bay in front of hundreds of locals and visitors, many flying kites and all cheering in appreciation. For more information see  The Baird Of Bute Website.

Baird of Bute Society

Baird of Bute Society was established in 2011 by Christopher Markwell, a Bute-born Canadian who now, in retirement, lives part of the year in Bute. Markwell was instrumental in bringing Andrew Baird to the fore for the centenary of his historic flight and arranged all of the events of the centenary and most since. The Baird of Bute Society works to support its vitally important mission of inspiring young people to aspire to achievement in their lives through its many scholarships, national awards and school programmes.

Most importantly, the society is focused on employing the entrepreneurial achievements of Baird to "inspire" the youth of Bute and Scotland to "aspire" to greater things. Enterprise and mentorship programmes, awards and scholarships are offered to assist in the promotion and development of youth academic-centered entrepreneurial skills and pursuits.

More information is available at https://www.bairdofbute.co.uk/baird-of-bute-society/

A Scottish charity registered at the Office of Scottish Charity Registration and established to proudly celebrate the achievements of Andrew Blain Baird, a son of Bute, who historically achieved the “First Attempted All-Scottish heavier-than-air powered flight” in September 1910 in a flying machine of his own construction.

The Baird of Bute Society mission is “to inspire” the youth of Scotland “to aspire” to achievement in their lives.

References

External links

 The Baird Of Bute Website
Bute pays tribute to Andrew Blain Baird
Bute pays tribute to the flying blacksmith
 Visit Bute – Andrew Blain Baird

1862 births
1951 deaths
20th-century Scottish people
Scottish businesspeople
People associated with the Isle of Bute
Scottish aviators